Leonie Menzel (born 19 May 1999) is a German rower. She competed in the women's double sculls event at the 2020 Summer Olympics.

References

External links
 

1999 births
Living people
German female rowers
Olympic rowers of Germany
Rowers at the 2020 Summer Olympics
Place of birth missing (living people)